C. bartschi may refer to:
 Conus bartschi, a sea snail species
 Curtitoma bartschi, a sea snail species
 Cymatosyrinx bartschi, a sea snail species

Synonyms 
 Collocalia bartschi, a synonym for Aerodramus bartschi, the Mariana swiftlet or Guam swiftlet, a bird species